This is a list of Iranian League winning football managers. 

Some managers listed have had more than one spell in charge at their current club or had spells at more than one club, however their time as manager is counted only from the date of their last appointment by their latest club. Zdravko Rajkov was the first coach who leads Taj to first ever championship in Iran. Amir Ghalenoi who won league in 2005–06, 2008–09, 2009–10, 2010–11 and 2012–13 is most decorated coach in Persian Gulf pro league.

Seasons and winning managers

Winning Managers performances

By nationality

See also
 Iran Pro League
 Iranian football champions
 List of Iranian club football top goal scorers
 List of Hazfi Cup winning managers
 List of Iranian Super Cup winning managers
 List of Iranian Futsal League winning managers

External links
Iran Pro league official history

 

1
Iran Pro League
managers
managers